Trans Pride Brighton is a pride march advocating transgender rights. Held in Brighton, East Sussex, the event has taken place annually since 2013.

History 
Trans Pride Brighton was founded in 2013, the first trans-specific march to be held in the UK. The co-founders included Fox Fisher and Sarah Savage.

The 2016 march saw attendance of several hundred people.

The 2017 march saw attendance of 2500 people.

The 2018 march saw attendance of 5000 people.

The 2019 march saw attendance of 8000 people, 2000 more than was anticipated by the organisers. The march that year used the slogan "putting the T first," in reference to the acronym LGBT, where the T is usually placed as the last letter.

In 2020 and 2021, the in-person march was cancelled due to the COVID-19 pandemic, with events being held digitally instead. The 2020 digital events saw a total audience of 10 000 viewers.

In 2022, the march returned to an in-person event, and saw attendance of over 20 000 people. The post-march festival was headlined by performance artist Travis Alabanza.

See also 
 LGBT community of Brighton and Hove

References 

Annual events in England
Pride parades in England
Recurring events established in 2013
Transgender events
Transgender organisations in the United Kingdom